Akatuy may refer to:

 Akatuy (village), a village in Siberia (Борзинский район Читинской области), a place of the Akatuy katorga
 Akatuy katorga of Russian Empire
 Akatuy, Chuvash festival of land fertility (see Sabantuy)